Oncideres argentata is a species of beetle in the family Cerambycidae. It was described by Dillon and Dillon in 1946. It is known from Colombia and Panama.

References

argentata
Beetles described in 1946